Alphabutt is an album of children's music by Kimya Dawson, recorded in February 2007, recorded with Hidden Vagenda producer Jason Carmer. The Alphabutt sessions were completed on February 21, 2008, and the full album was released on K Records in September 2008.

Nine of the ten original songs have also appeared on self-released EP entitled Alphabutt E.Pee sold on Kimya's world tour in 2007.  Each copy of the EP came in a unique hand-decorated folder of colored cardboard held together by a string. The folder contained an Alphabutt CD-R, a handwritten fact sheet and nine sheets of drawings on pink paper - one for each song. The flipside of the folder reads "made with love at the great crap factory".

Against previous plans, the retail CD did not come with a children's book: "I decided to just release it as a cd, because then it will be out much faster. I am going to make a book for kids another time. It will take forever to get a book completed but the cd is so close to being done. It is a crazy album! I am really excited about it."

Track listing

Personnel 
 Callidora Cadogan – kazoo, vocals
 Kevin Cadogan – kazoo
 Jason Carmer – bass, guitar, drums, vocals, handclapping, producer, engineer, rattle, audio production
 Nico Carmer – drums, vocals, handclapping
 Kimya Dawson – guitar, piano, kazoo, vocals, handclapping, producer, audio production
 Erez Frank – vocals
 Sofia Jeremias – vocals
 Aki Mantia – piano
 Bryan "Brain" Mantia – drums, vocals
 McAlister Shea – drums, vocals
 Milo Milstead Murgia – drums
 Panda Dawson-Duval – piano, vocals
 Amani Shea – drums
 Barbara Shipowo – vocals
 Angelo Spencer – guitar, drums, vocals, wood block, blocks

References 

Kimya Dawson albums
K Records albums
2007 albums